Matt or Matthew Brown may refer to:

Sports
Matt Brown (fighter) (born 1981), American mixed martial arts fighter
Matt Brown (basketball) (born 1969), former head basketball coach at the University of Missouri-Kansas City
Matt Brown (parathlete) (born 1976), paralympic track and field athlete in Idalou, Texas
Matt Brown (kick returner) (born 1989), American football kick returner
Matt Brown (running back) (1891–1954), American football player
Matty Brown (born 1990), English footballer
Matthew Brown (baseball) (born 1982), Major League Baseball third baseman
Matt Brown, New Zealand sprinter (born 1986),  see Athletics at the 2006 Commonwealth Games – Men's 4 × 100 metres relay

Politics
Matt Brown (American politician) (born 1969), co-founder of Global Zero, former Secretary of State of Rhode Island
Matt Brown (Australian politician) (born 1972), former member of the New South Wales Legislative Assembly
Matt Brown (Canadian politician), former mayor of London, Ontario, Canada

Other
Matthew Brown (college president) (1776–1853), president of Jefferson College and Washington College
Matthew B. Brown (1964–2011), Latter-day Saint writer and historian
Matt Brown (broadcaster) (born 1973), British television and radio presenter
Matthew Brown brewery, Blackburn, United Kingdom
Matthew Brown Games, a company behind the games Hexcells, SquareCells and CrossCell

See also
Matt Browne (disambiguation)